Chicken Girls is an American web series starring Annie LeBlanc, Hayden Summerall, Hayley LeBlanc, Brooke Elizabeth Butler, Riley Lewis, Indiana Massara, Mads Lewis, Aliyah Moulden, Rush Holland, Dylan Conrique, Caden Conrique, Carson Lueders, and more. The series, produced by Brat, premiered on YouTube on September 5, 2017.

The series is known for launching the careers of Annie LeBlanc, Hayden Summerall, Brooke Elizabeth Butler, and Indiana Massara. A spinoff series, Chicken Girls: College Years, which follows Rooney and Birdie in college together, debuted online on August 2, 2022.

Premise
Chicken Girls tells the story of middle school student Rhyme McAdams and her friends, Ellie, Quinn, and Kayla – known as "The Chicken Girls" – who have been dancing together forever. The show follows the girls as they navigate dance, friendship, crushes, and learning how to grow up. But as they begin their freshman year at Attaway High School (season 3), everything's changing.

In Season 7, Harmony has found her own squad of Chicken Girls. With all the backstabbing, secret-keeping and boy drama, can the new girl group survive middle school?

Cast

Main

Recurring

Introduced in season 1
 Jeremiah Perkins as Hamilton (seasons 1–4): Rooney's ex-boyfriend
 Kelsey Leon as Kimmie (seasons 1–3): a friend of Luna's and former member of the Power Surge dance team
 Erin Reese DeJarnette as Beth (seasons 1–3): a friend of Luna's and former member of the Power Surge dance team
 Talin Silva as Jade (seasons 1–3): a friend of Luna's and former member of the Power Surge dance team
 Jenna Davis as Monica Allen (seasons 1–2): a friend of Luna and former member of the Power Surge dance team. Her parents own Allen's Arcade. She is the granddaughter of Cathy Fitzroy and Allen Alvarez from A Girl Named Jo.
 Breanna D'Amico as Sandy (seasons 1–2): a friend of Ellie's and another member of Miles' band
 Greg Marks as Henry Barnett (seasons 1, 3): Rooney's former boyfriend
 HRVY as Miles (season 1): Ellie's former love interest
 Caitlin Carmichael as Laney Raymond (season 1): TK's former girlfriend
 Isabella Durham as Sierra Raymond (season 1): Laney's twin sister and a girl Ace briefly dated

Introduced in season 2
 Holly Gagnier as Robin Robbins (seasons 2–3): a music producer in L.A. and ex-best friend of Miss McCallister, Ms. Mack, & Mrs. Sharpe. Her real name is Roberta Roach.
 Billy LeBlanc as Mr. Forrester (seasons 2–3): Rooney's father and Quinn's stepfather
 Steven Parker as Principal Mathers (seasons 2–3): the principal of Attaway High
 Brooke Burke as Tiffany Mack (seasons 2–3): Ellie's mother
 Lilia Buckingham as Autumn Miller (season 2): Luna and Birdie's rival and the captain of the Millwood Dance Team
 Olivia Espara as Naomi (season 2): a former member of the Attaway Dance Team
 Grant Knoche as Jules (season 2): Luna's childhood friend
 Christian Lalama as Paul (season 2): the manager for the Millwood Dance Team who develops a crush on Rhyme
 Ariel Martin as Dru (season 2): an employee at the Attaway Arcade
 Aidette Cancino as Holly (season 2): Ace's former crush. She works for the Attaway Appeal and it is revealed by Tim that she got Mathilda (a character played by MaeMae Renfrow from another Brat show based on/named after Attaway Appeal) fired from the newspaper. 
 Nathan Triska as Frankie (season 2): a former member of Attaway Dance Team, dubbed "Chicken Boy" by Rhyme, Quinn, Kayla, and Birdie
 Brec Bassinger as Babs (season 2): Flash's father's assistant, and Ace's crush. She is a struggling actress. 
 Ben Alezart as Bagel (season 2): the captain of the Attaway school basketball team. In a different Brat show called Brobot, it is revealed that Bagel's real name is Bobby. 
 Andy Milder as Edward (season 2): Flash's father, a famous movie producer who lives in Los Angeles
 Alex and Alan Stokes as Lukas and Roscoe (season 2): members of the Attaway school basketball team
 Paris Simone as Suzie (season 2): a former member of the Power Surge dance team
 Cameron McLaeod as Billy Ridgeway (seasons 2, 5): a member of the Attaway Appeal

Introduced in season 3
 Lily Chee as Britney (seasons 3–5): one of the queen B's at Attaway High. She is a top student and journalist for the Attaway Appeal.
 Sean Cavaliere as Spike Smith (recurring, season 3; guest star, seasons 4–5): Birdie's ex-boyfriend
 Jay Ulloa as Drake (seasons 3–4): a theatre actor and Rhyme's ex-boyfriend
 Heidi Kaufman as Suzy Kaye (seasons 3–4): TK and Birdie's mother
 Emma Maddock as Mel (seasons 3, 5): Stephanie's ex-girlfriend
 Tatiana Turan as Molly McAdams (seasons 3, 5): Rhyme and Harmony's mother
 Sissy Sheridan as Angie (season 3): the self-titled "queen" of drama club until Rhyme joins
 Kaylyn Slevin as Beatrice (season 3): the leader of the queen B's at Attaway High
 Isabelle Marcus as Becky 1 (season 3): one of the queen B's at Attaway High
 Josie Nivar as Becky 2 (season 3): one of the queen B's at Attaway High
 Rebecca Zamolo as Mrs. Forrester (season 3): Quinn's mother, and Rooney's stepmother
 Luke Dodge as young T.K. (season 3)
 Trinity Valenzuela as young Rhyme (season 3, 8)

Introduced in season 4
 Diezel Braxton as Arthur (seasons 4–5): a student at Attaway High
 Paul Thomas Arnold as Junior Chambers (season 4–present): the owner of Junior's. He is a recurring character across the Brat universe.
 William Franklyn-Miller as Ezra Grant (season 4): Rhyme's former crush, and classmate whom she met in Spring Breakaway.
 Kiana Naomi as Effie (season 4): a good friend of Rhyme's who attends Crown Lake. The two met in Spring Breakaway.
 Alex Guzman as Jax Brinkman (season 4): Britney's boyfriend
 Nataliz Jiménez as Elena (season 4): Ezra's abusive stepmother
 Dino Petrera as Billy (season 4): a kid who works for the Attaway Appeal

Introduced in season 5
 Carter Southern as Isaac Jones (season 5): a member of Attaway High's football team. He is a main character in Zoe Valentine.
 Tariq Brown as Evan (season 5): a member of Attaway High's football team
 Kai Peters as Jesse Hawkins (season 5): a classmate of Rhyme and Wes's rival, also known as "The Falcon", which is his stage name for the Attaway radio station he runs
 Blaine Maye as Johnny Valentine (season 5): Robbie's cousin and River's friend. He stars in Dirt and also appears in Boss Cheer.
 Catherine Grady as Mrs. Henderson (season 5): the social studies teacher at Attaway High

Introduced in season 6
 Chris Romero as Carlos (season 6): a member of Ellie's debate team
 Gigi Cesare as Tonya (season 6): a girl in Birdie, Rooney, Luna, and Ty's gym class
 Amelie Anstett as Sadie (season 6): TK's girlfriend back in Texas
 Anirudh Pisharody as Benji (season 6): Gemma's ex-boyfriend
 Kesley Leroy as Jessica (season 6): a member of the Attaway High cheer team

Introduced in season 7 
 Andrew Davis II as Mr. Giamarra (seasons 7–8): a reading and literature teacher for Harmony and her friends
 Sawyer Fuller as Portia (seasons 7–8): a worker at the Parlor Ice Cream Shop
 Ansa Woo as Tanya Kham (season 7): Eggie's mother who is best friends with Bel's mother
 Alyssa Gutierrez-Sierra as Star (season 7): Simone's teammate and Harmony's former friend

Introduced in season 8
 Brooklyn Courtney-Moore as Margo (season 8–9): Leyla's friend and later rival and head editor of the junior appeal
 Lauren Rosa as Young Harmony (season 8)
 Ella Noel as Tamara (season 8)
 Mila Skye Rouse as Judy (season 8–present)
 Sir Cornwell as Ernie (season 8–9) 
 Hailey Villarreal as Grace (season 8)

Introduced in season 9 
 Mehra Marzbani as Yasmina 
 Tina Hohman as Emerson 
 Adriana Camposano as Poppy

Introduced in season 10 
 Nicolette Peck as Ivy
 Lizzy Howell as Kara
 Raihyah as Bailey
 Ayumi Matsumoto as JJ
 Anna Mia Conley as Petra
 Meztli Quetzalcoatl as Theo
 Matthew Garbacz as Finn
 La'Ron Hines as Ben

Episodes

Production and release 

Production and filming for the series' first season commenced August 6, 2017. The series was first reported by Variety on August 21, 2017. Alana Johnson was originally cast a series regular, but she dropped the role to produce her own film. The second season premiered on February 14, 2018. In June 2018, Brat released Chicken Girls: The Movie which takes place between the second and third seasons of Chicken Girls. On August 9, 2018, The Hollywood Reporter announced season 3 would premiere on September 4, 2018. 

The Brat Holiday Spectacular film, featuring Annie LeBlanc, Indiana Massara, Aliyah Moulden, Mackenzie Ziegler and other performers from Chicken Girls, along with cast from Total Eclipse and Boss Cheer, was released in December 2018. The film takes place between Chicken Girls season 3 and Spring Breakaway. In March 2019, Brat released the Spring Breakaway film, which stars Annie LeBlanc, Lilia Buckingham, Anna Cathcart, Kianna Naomi and William Franklyn Miller. This film takes place between Holiday Spectacular and Chicken Girls season 4.

The series was renewed for a fourth season, which premiered on March 19, 2019. In August 2019, Brat released the Intern-in-Chief film, which featured much of the Chicken Girls cast, notably Annie LeBlanc, Brooke Elizabeth Butler, Riley Lewis, and Kianna Naomi, with Indiana Massara, Hayley LeBlanc, Matt Sato, Rush Holland, Mads Lewis, and Aliyah Moulden appearing as well. The film takes place between the fourth and fifth seasons of Chicken Girls. The fifth season premiered on September 3, 2019. In November 2019, the series was renewed for a sixth season, which premiered on March 10, 2020.

In August 2020, Brat announced a new cast for the seventh season of Chicken Girls, which included Hayley LeBlanc, Coco Quinn, Txunamy Ortiz, and Corrine Joy from Mani, as well as Enzo Lopez, Elliana Wamsley, Matteo Gallegos, Michael Aboujaoude, Skyler Aboujaoude, Kheris Rogers, Aidan Prince, Santiago Carrera, and Liam-Alexander Newman. The season was originally set to premiere on September 1, 2020, but was pushed back to September 8. In 2020, a behind the scenes documentary series Chicken Girls: The Docuseries was released alongside season 7. Season 8 was being filmed as of February 1, 2021, and was released on March 23, 2021.

Filming 
The main filming location for Chicken Girls, besides Brat Studios, is Ramona Convent Secondary School. It was used as the school in the series' first season, and in Chicken Girls: The Movie, as well for most of the fourth through sixth seasons.

Reception

Viewership 
Forbes reported that Chicken Girls and another Brat show, Total Eclipse, helped the network accumulate a "loyal audience" of 15 million unique viewers in three months that "the company is beginning to monetize by moving into advertising in 2019".

Chicken Girls: The Movie was the most viewed program on Brat of all time, having more than 38 million views . The Brat Holiday Spectacular, featuring Annie LeBlanc, Indiana Massara, Aliyah Moulden, Mackenzie Ziegler, other cast from Chicken Girls, has been viewed more than 7.7 million times . The Spring Breakaway film has been viewed more than 8.8 million times, while the Intern-in-Chief film has been viewed more than 4.5 million times, .

Awards

Spinoffs 
The popularity of Chicken Girls has led the team at Brat TV to produces accompanying spinoff series to the show. The first series, Rooney's Last Roll, follows Rooney Forrester as she struggles to move on from her relationship with Stephanie after finding a film roll from the last time they were together. It premiered on November 11, 2020.

A second spinoff series, Chicken Girls: College Years, follows Rooney and Birdie as they start their new lives in college and encounter new challenges along the way. It premiered on August 2, 2022.

A third spinoff series, Chicken Girls: Forever Team, centers on Simone and her friends, who have to navigate their life with Harmony having moved away. It premiered on November 3, 2022.

References

External links
 
 Chicken Girls on Youtube

Brat (digital network)
2017 web series debuts
2010s YouTube series
2020s YouTube series
American drama web series
American teen drama web series
YouTube original programming